
Vaněk (feminine Vaňková) is a Czech language surname that is a diminutive of the name Václav or Veceslav, which means "greater glory", from the Old Slavic elements  "greater" and  "glory". Alternative spellings of the name include Vaněk, Vaňková, Vankova, and Wanek. The name may refer to:

Chase Wright Vanek (born 1996), American actor 
Connie Wanek (born 1952), American poet
František Vaněk (born 1931), Czech ice hockey player
Jan Vaněk (born 1979), Czech athlete
Jaroslav Vanek (1930–2017), American economist
Jean-Pierre Vanek (born 1969), Luxembourgian footballer
Jiří Vaněk (tennis) (born 1978), Czech tennis player
Joe Vaněk (born 1948), British opera designer and director
Karel Vaněk (1895–1958), Czech chess master
Kateřina Vaňková (born 1989), Czech tennis player
Ludmila Vaňková, Czech writer
Margit Vanek (born 1986), Hungarian athlete
Miroslav Wanek (born 1962), Czech writer
Ollie Vanek (1908–2000), American baseball player and manager 
Ondřej Vaněk (born 1990), Czech footballer
Richard Vaněk (born 1991), Czech footballer
Ronald G. Wanek (born 1941), American businessman
Šárka Vaňková (born 1987), Czech singer
Thomas Vanek (born 1984), Austrian ice hockey player
Todd R. Wanek (born 1963), American businessman
Zdeněk Vaněk (born 1968), Czech handball player

Fiction
Ferdinand Vaněk, fictional character in the works of Václav Havel and other

See also 
Vanek (disambiguation)

References 

Czech-language surnames
Slavic-language surnames